Rempel is a surname. Notable people with the surname include:

Aganetha Dyck (born 1937 as Aganetha Rempel), Canadian artist
Byron Rempel (born 1962), Canadian writer
Chad Rempel (born 1982), Canadian football slotback and long snapper
Garry Rempel (1944-2018), Canadian scientist
Jordan Rempel (born 1985), Canadian football offensive lineman
Kevin Rempel (born 1982), Canadian sledge hockey player
Michelle Rempel (born 1980), Canadian politician
Nathan Rempel (born 1977), Canadian ice hockey player
Shannon Rempel (born 1984), Canadian speed skater
William Rempel (born 1947), American author and investigative journalist

Rempel may also refer to:
Rempel, Ohio, United States, an unincorporated community

References

Russian Mennonite surnames